Joachim Dahissiho is a Beninese politician, having run for the office of the Beninese presidency in 2011. He came in 14th, with 4,724 votes and 0.19% of the total votes.

External links
 http://www.ourcampaigns.com/CandidateDetail.html?CandidateID=272819

21st-century Beninese politicians
Living people
Year of birth missing (living people)
Candidates for President of Benin
Place of birth missing (living people)